Last of the Summer Wine's twelfth series aired on BBC1. All of the episodes were written by Roy Clarke and produced and directed by Alan J. W. Bell.

With the departure of Michael Aldridge who had left to nurse his ill wife, the character of Foggy Dewhirst returned to the fold.

Outline
The trio in this series consisted of:

Returning this series

Foggy Dewhurst (1976–1985, 1990–1997)

Last appearances

Seymour Utterthwaite (1986–1990)
Barry Wilkinson (1986–1990, 1996–2010)

List of episodes
Regular series

Christmas Special (1990)

DVD release
The box set for series twelve was released by Universal Playback in December 2008, mislabelled as a box set for series 13 & 14.

References

See also

Last of the Summer Wine series
1990 British television seasons